Adam Jezierski Ros (born 11 July 1990) is a Polish actor based in Spain. He is known for playing lead role in the series Física o Química as Gorka Martínez Mora.

Biography 
Adam Jezierski was born on 11 July 1990 in Warsaw, Poland. His family moved to Madrid, Spain when he was 7.

Career 
In 2003, Jezierski made his acting debut appearing in film Sueños, which won the Goya award for best shortfilm.

In 2004, he acted in the movie Siete.

In 2007, he makes a small participation in the television series  Hospital Central and Cuéntame.

From 2008 to 2011, he was the protagonist of the youth television series Física o Química with Gonzalo Ramos, Leonor Martín, Angy Fernández, Javier Calvo, Úrsula Corberó, Andrea Duro, Karim El-Kerem, Maxi Iglesias, Sandra Blázquez, Nasser Saleh, Álex Martínez, Adrián Rodríguez, Miriam Giovanelli, Andrés Cheung, Óscar Sinela, Irene Sánchez, Álex Batllori, Lucía Ramos, Lorena Mateo and Álex Hernández. Jezierski's co–star Javier Calvo stated he considered the themes of the series "are problems that are also present in reality".

In 2009, he acted in the movie Fat People with Antonio de la Torre, Raúl Arévalo and Verónica Sánchez. 

In 2010, Jezierski acted in the movies Tensión sexual no resuelta and Cruzado el límite. 

From 2011 to 2012, he makes a small participation in the television series Cheers.

In 2013, he acted in the movie Blockbuster.

In 2015, Jezierski makes a small participation in the television Web series Aula de castigo starring Álex Martínez, Leonor Martín, Lucía Delgado, Ricardo Bascuñán, Markos Marín and Lorenzo Ayuso and he is also the Casting Director of the series.

In 2020, it is confirmed that the actor will give life to Gorka Martínez Mora in Física o Química: El reencuentro for the platform Atresplayer Premium.

Filmography

Movies

Television

Television Programs

Videoclips

Awards and nominations

References

External links 
 Official Website
 

1991 births
Living people
Male actors from Warsaw
Male actors from Madrid
Polish emigrants to Spain
Polish male film actors
Polish male stage actors
Polish male television actors
Spanish male film actors
Spanish male stage actors
Spanish male television actors
21st-century Polish male actors
21st-century Spanish male actors